The Sharada English High School is a school in Kalyan, India. It was established in 2007 with 32 students. The school is capable of enrolling 1200 students but they are trying to create an environment for up to 7200 students. 

The school has classes from playschool to std VIII.

The school has a large campus and playground. It has a music room, an art and craft room, a computer laboratory and a library.

External links
 Official site

2007 establishments in Maharashtra
Educational institutions established in 2007
Schools in Thane district